The World IBJJF Jiu-Jitsu Championship (commonly known as the Worlds or Mundials) is a Brazilian Jiu-Jitsu tournament held once every year by the International Brazilian Jiu-Jitsu Federation. It is widely considered to be the most important and prestigious jiu-jitsu tournament of the year. 

The first edition took place in February 1996 in Rio de Janeiro, Brazil. Since 2007 the tournament has been held  in California, USA. The last edition of the championships took place at the California State University, Long Beach in June 2022.

History 
The first World Championship was held in 1996 at the Tijuca Tênis Clube in Rio de Janeiro, Brazil. The first Mundial tournament to be held outside of Brazil was in 2007 at the California State University in Long Beach, California. The Championship has been held in California ever since. Many considered the World Jiu-Jitsu Championship as the toughest and the most prestigious Gi tournament in the world.  Its counterpart in No-Gi is the World IBJJF Jiu-Jitsu No-Gi Championship.

Weight classes 

The men's division started in 1996 with a total of 10 divisions from –57.5 kg to the absolute (open class) division. The women's division started in 1998 with two weight classes "Light" and "Heavy". Since 2016 the women's division now comprised a total of 9 weight classes from -48.5 kg up to the absolute (open class) division.

Competitions by year

Men's black belt world champions

Women's black belt world champions

List of winners by total titles

List of titles by team

Notable champions 

Marcus Almeida – 13x World Champion (6 absolute titles)
Roger Gracie – 10x World Champion (3 absolute titles)
Beatriz Mesquita – 10x World Champion (2 absolute titles)
Bruno Malfacine – 10x Roosterweight World Champion
Michelle Nicolini – 8x World Champion (1 absolute title)
Leandro Lo – 8x World Champion (1 Absolute title)
Alexandre Ribeiro – 7x World Champion (2 absolute titles)
Leticia Ribeiro – 7x World Champion
André Galvão – 5x World Champion
Rafael Mendes – 6x World Champion
Lucas Lepri – 6x World Champion
Rodolfo Vieira – 5x World Champion (1 absolute title)
Marcelo Garcia – 5x World Champion
Rubens Charles Maciel – 5x World Champion
Robson Moura – 5x World Champion
Saulo Ribeiro – 5x World Champion
Romulo Barral – 5x World Champion
Bernardo Faria – 4x World Champion (1 absolute title)
Royler Gracie – 4x World Champion
Guilherme Mendes – 4x World Champion
Mikey Musumeci – 4x World Champion (first American to ever win multiple world titles and first American to ever win world titles in two different divisions)
Ronaldo "Jacare" Souza – 3x World Champion (2 absolute titles)
Fabrício Werdum – 2x World Champion
João Roque – 1997 Light Featherweight World Champion (1st African & Non-Brazilian champion)
B.J. Penn – 2000 Featherweight World Champion (1st American champion)
Laurence Cousin – 2007 Featherweight World Champion (1st European/French & Non-Brazilian female champion)
Ffion Davies – 2022 Lightweight World Champion (1st British/Welsh champion)

See also 
 IBJJF
 Brazilian Jiu-Jitsu weight classes
 World IBJJF Jiu-Jitsu No-Gi Championship
 European IBJJF Jiu-Jitsu Championship
 European IBJJF Jiu-Jitsu No-Gi Championship
 Pan IBJJF Jiu-Jitsu Championship
 Pan IBJJF Jiu-Jitsu No-Gi Championship
 Brazilian National Jiu-Jitsu Championship
 Brazilian Nationals Jiu-Jitsu No-Gi Championship
 Asian IBJJF Jiu Jitsu Championship

References

External links 
 World IBJJF Jiu-Jitsu Championship final results June 30, 2022 

 
Brazilian jiu-jitsu competitions
Jiu-Jitsu